Belfast Confetti may refer to:
Belfast Confetti (poem), a poem by Ciaran Carson
Belfast Confetti (album), an album by Ricky Warwick